Cayadutta Creek is a river in Fulton and Montgomery counties in the state of New York. It begins northwest of Gloversville and flows in a general southward direction before flowing into the Mohawk River in Fonda. The Indian meaning of Cayadutta is "rippling waters" or "shallow water running over stones". This stream has commercial and historical importance as the cities of Johnstown and Gloversville lie on its banks.

Geology 
The Cayadutta Creek, or some similarly located stream, was one of the ancient watercourses which drained the southern Adirondack slopes.

References 

Rivers of Montgomery County, New York
Mohawk River
Rivers of New York (state)